Steve Schneider is a former American football and softball coach and college athletics administrator. He served as the head football coach at Midland Lutheran College—now known as Midland University—in Fremont, Nebraska from 1992 to 2001 and Peru State College in Peru, Nebraska from 2012 to 2019, compiling a career college football coaching record of 86–103. Schneider was the athletic director at Midland from 1992 to 2007 and Peru State from 2011 to 2018. At Midland, Schneider was also the head softball coach from 1988 to 1992. He retired from coaching in December 2019. 

Schneider played college football as a defensive lineman at Midland and was captain of the 1979 team before graduating in 1980. He joined the coaching staff at Midland as a part-time assistant in 1980. He was named linebackers coach in 1985 and promoted to defensive coordinator in 1988.

Head coaching record

Football

References

Year of birth missing (living people)
Living people
American football defensive linemen
Midland Warriors athletic directors
Midland Warriors football coaches
Midland Warriors football players
Peru State Bobcats athletic directors
Peru State Bobcats football coaches
College softball coaches in the United States